SimCity is a video game series.

SimCity or Sim City may also refer to:

SimCity (1989 video game), in the SimCity video game series
SimCity (2013 video game), in the SimCity video game series
Sim City (album), by Susumu Hirasawa, 1995

See also